Ahmed Fayez Al-Dosari (born 3 July 1985) is a Saudi Arabian long jumper. He competed at the 2015 World Championships in Beijing without qualifying for the final. He was a silver medallist at the 2004 Asian Indoor Athletics Championships and a bronze medallist at the 2015 Arab Athletics Championships.

His personal bests in the event are 8.12 metres outdoors (+1.4 m/s) (Al-Qatif 2002) and 7.76 metres indoors (Teheran 2004).

Competition record

See also
 Saudi Arabia at the 2015 World Championships in Athletics

References

Saudi Arabian male long jumpers
Living people
Place of birth missing (living people)
1985 births
World Athletics Championships athletes for Saudi Arabia